Cytoplasmic dynein 1 light intermediate chain 2 is a protein that in humans is encoded by the DYNC1LI2 gene.

References

Further reading